The General Inspectorate of Aviation (Inspectoratul General de Aviație) (formerly Special Aviation Unit - Unitatea Specialǎ de Aviaţie) is Ministry of Internal Affairs's air component. The unit was initially established in 1947, but restructured in  1978. It has its overall headquarters at Aurel Vlaicu International Airport and operates three territorial flights in Cluj-Napoca, Iaşi and Tulcea. The Special Aviation Unit currently operates Mi-8 3, Mi-17 3 EC-135 2 Iar-330 politie 2 and Iar-316b politie 2 helicopters.

Missions
Search and rescue missions.
Humanitarian and community missions.
Monitoring road traffic.
Other special designation missions in cooperation with the Romanian Police, Gendarmerie or Romanian Intelligence Service.

External links
 Official website
 Special Aviation Unit on Ministry of Interior's official website

Police aviation
Romanian Police
National law enforcement agencies of Romania
Aviation in Romania